Clive Forrester (1911-1992), was a United States international lawn bowler.

Bowls career
He won a gold medal in the triples with Bill Miller and Dick Folkins at the 1972 World Outdoor Bowls Championship in Worthing. He also won a bronze medal in the team event (Leonard Trophy).

He won two US National titles, the singles in 1970 and pairs in 1969.

Personal life
He was a postal worker by trade and started bowling in 1957 and was elected to the A.L.B.A when the Pacific Mountain Division was formed.

References

1911 births
1992 deaths
American male bowls players
Bowls World Champions